2003 J.League Cup Final was the 11th final of the J.League Cup competition. The final was played at National Stadium in Tokyo on November 3, 2003. Urawa Reds won the championship.

Match details

See also
2003 J.League Cup

References

J.League Cup
2003 in Japanese football
Urawa Red Diamonds matches
Kashima Antlers matches